LIPE may refer to:

Guinean League for Ecological Protection, a political party in Guinea-Bissau
Hormone-sensitive lipase, an enzyme
The ICAO-code of Bologna Guglielmo Marconi Airport